The 1979–80 Northern Premier League was the twelfth season of the Northern Premier League, a regional football league in Northern England, the northern areas of the Midlands and North Wales. The season began on 18 August 1979 and concluded on 7 May 1980.

Overview
The League featured twenty-two clubs.

Team changes
The Alliance Premier League was established as a new, national top division of non-League football. Seven Northern Premier League clubs and thirteen clubs from the Premier Division of the Southern League joined the newly created Alliance Premier League. The remaining clubs in the Northern Premier League had effectively been relegated down one tier in the English football league system.

The following seven clubs left the League at the end of the previous season:
Altrincham promoted to Alliance Premier League
Bangor City promoted to Alliance Premier League
Barrow promoted to Alliance Premier League
Boston United promoted to Alliance Premier League
Northwich Victoria promoted to Alliance Premier League
Scarborough promoted to Alliance Premier League
Stafford Rangers promoted to Alliance Premier League

The following six clubs joined the League at the start of the season:
Burton Albion promoted from Southern League Division One North
Grantham promoted from Southern League Division One North
Marine promoted from Cheshire County League Division One
Oswestry Town promoted from Southern League Division One North
Tamworth promoted from Southern League Division One North
Witton Albion  promoted from Cheshire County League Division One

League table

Results

Stadia and locations

Cup results

Challenge Cup

Northern Premier League Shield

Between Champions of NPL Premier Division and Winners of the NPL Cup.

FA Cup

None of the twenty-two Northern Premier League clubs reached the second round:

First Round

FA Trophy

Two of the twenty-two Northern Premier League clubs reached the fourth round:

Fourth Round

Semi-finals

Final

End of the season
At the end of the twelfth season of the Northern Premier League, Frickley Athletic applied to join the Alliance Premier League and were successful

Promotion and relegation
The following club left the League at the end of the season:
Frickley Athletic promoted to Alliance Premier League

The following club joined the League the following season:
King's Lynn transferred from Southern League Midland Division

References

External links
 Northern Premier League official website
 Northern Premier League tables at RSSSF
 Football Club History Database

Northern Premier League seasons
6